Noah Gregory Kekoa Haaheo Pang-Potjes (born June 5, 1991) is an American professional wrestler. He is best known for his time in WWE, where he performed on their NXT brand under the ring name Kona Reeves.

Professional wrestling career

Independent circuit (2013–2014)
Pang-Potjes was trained to be a professional wrestler by Afa Anoa'i at the Wild Samoan Pro Wrestling Training Center. He wrestled for World Xtreme Wrestling under the ring name Noah Kekoa, where he held the WXW Heavyweight Championship.

WWE (2014–2021) 

In May 2014, it was announced that Pang-Potjes had signed with WWE. He began working at NXT live events from April 2015 and made his first major appearance in September 2015 as part of the inaugural Dusty Rhodes Tag Team Classic, teaming with Alexander Wolfe as a last minute replacement for Marcus Louis in a first-round defeat to The Hype Bros. Working under his real name, Potjes had his first televised singles match on the May 4, 2016 episode of NXT, losing to No Way Jose. Potjes made several further televised appearances, losing to Tye Dillinger and Andrade "Cien" Almas. In November 2016, Potjes adopted the new ring name Kona Reeves. On the November 23 episode of NXT, a match between Reeves and Rich Swann was interrupted by SAnitY, who attacked both men. Reeves then made several further televised appearances throughout the early part of 2017, losing to Aleister Black and Hideo Itami.

After a long absence from television, a vignette aired on the April 18, 2018 episode of NXT promoting Reeves' return as "The Finest" Kona Reeves. He would make his return two weeks later defeating Patrick Scott, establishing himself as a heel. Reeves would then continue making sporadic appearances on NXT over the next couple of years. On August 6, 2021, Reeves was released from his WWE contract.

Personal life 
Pang-Potjes is of Native Hawaiian, Chinese, Dutch, Indonesian, Filipino and Spanish descent.
He now works as a German Mechanic at Indiana Jones Epic Stunt Spectacular in Disney’s Hollywood Studios.

Championship and accomplishments 
 Pro Wrestling Illustrated
 Ranked No. 324 of the 500 best singles wrestlers in the PWI 500 in 2018
 World Xtreme Wrestling
 WXW Heavyweight Championship (1 time)

References

External links 
 

1992 births
Living people
American people of Chinese descent
American people of Dutch descent
American people of Indonesian descent
American people of Spanish descent
American people of Native Hawaiian descent
Native Hawaiian professional wrestlers
Professional wrestlers from Hawaii
American male professional wrestlers
American professional wrestlers of Filipino descent
21st-century professional wrestlers